This is a list of Indian sweets and desserts, also called mithai, a significant element in Indian cuisine. Indians are known for their unique taste and experimental behavior when it comes to food.  Many Indian desserts are fried foods made with sugar, milk or condensed milk. Ingredients and preferred types of dessert vary by region. In the eastern part of India, for example, most are based on milk products. Many are flavoured with almonds and pistachios, spiced with cardamon, nutmeg, cloves and black pepper, and decorated with nuts, or with gold or silver leaf.

North

East

South

West

Pan-Indian

See also 

 List of Indian snack foods
 List of pastries

References

External links
 

Desserts
Indian